Hans Bauer is an Austrian screenwriter, author, and photographer, working in the United States, who is best known for his writing for the films Anaconda (1997) and Anacondas: The Hunt for the Blood Orchid (2004). Bauer is also the co-author (with Catherine Masciola) of the children's adventure novel, Fishtale, and the author of Anaconda: The Writer's Cut.

Bauer was born in Austria, and lives and works in Texas and Los Angeles.

Screenwriting
Bauer wrote the original screenplay for the film Anaconda, which received mainly negative reviews from film critics. Bauer was one of several writers who are credited with screenwriting the 2004 sequel, Anacondas: The Hunt for the Blood Orchid, which also failed to garner critical acclaim.

The horror film, Komodo, based on Bauer's screenplay, was also panned by critics, while his next film, Titan A. E., in which he was also an associate producer, received praise for its animated effects.

Filmography 

Anaconda  (1997)
Milo (1998; producer)
Komodo (1999)
Titan A.E. (2000; story, producer)
Highwaymen (2004)
Anacondas: The Hunt for the Blood Orchid (2004; story and elements from the original Anaconda script)
The Flock (2007)

Published works

Fishtale (2012)
Anaconda: The Writer's Cut
In the Beginning (1991, 2013; editor; non-fiction)

Photography 

Bauer is a photographer, and his photo-based art has been the subject of several group and one-man shows in Los Angeles, San Francisco, Austin, and the Texas Hill Country.

References

External links 

Hans Bauer, Official Site
Fishtale, Official Site
Hans Bauer on Facebook
Anaconda: The Writer's Cut Official Site

Year of birth missing (living people)
Living people